Ernst Meyer may refer to:

 Ernst Heinrich Friedrich Meyer (1791–1858), German botanist
 Ernst Meyer (painter) (1797-1861), Danish painter
 Ernst Meyer (Swedish politician) (1847–1925), Swedish politician
 Ernst Meyer (German politician) (1887–1930), German Communist Party leader
 Ernst Meyer (historian) (1898-1975), German ancient historian
 Ernst Hermann Meyer (1905–1988), German composer and musicologist

See also
 Ernst Walter Mayr (1904–2005), German evolutionary biologist
 :de:Ernst Meyer, a longer list in German Wiki